Samuel Seymour Epstein (April 13, 1926 – 
March 18, 2018) was a physician and, at the time of his death, professor emeritus of environmental and occupational health at the School of Public Health of the University of Illinois at Chicago. He is known for his contributions on avoidable causes of cancer, for which he was given the Right Livelihood Award in 1998. His papers are held at the National Library of Medicine in Bethesda, Maryland.

Biography
Epstein was born in England on April 13, 1926, to Isidore and Gertrude Epstein and emigrated to the United States in 1960. For ten years he held a position at the Children's Cancer Research Foundation and Harvard University. He then became a distinguished professor at Case Western Reserve University before moving to the University of Illinois in 1976. In addition to 270 scientific articles, he published 12 books, and was active in publicizing claims on the carcinogenic properties of chlordane pesticides, growth hormones in milk, nitrosamines in bacon, saccharin, beverage preservatives, and other food additives. His work drew criticism from the U. S. Food and Drug Administration, which claimed that his book The Safe Shopper's Bible misleads consumers by labeling safe products as carcinogenic. He was a strong critic of the American Cancer Society.

Books

 .
 .
 . Vol. II. Cosmetics and Drugs, Pesticides, Food Additives, MIT Press, 1976.
 . Abridged Japanese translation, 1978. Revised and expanded edition, Anchor/Doubleday Press, New York, 1979. The Politics of Cancer, Revisited, East Ridge Press, Fremont Center, N.Y., 1998.
 .
 .
 .
 . 2nd ed. (with Levert), Macmillan, 1998.
 .
 . 2nd ed., Environmental Toxicology, 2005. Japanese ed., Lyon-sha Publishing, 2006.
 .
 . 
 .
 .

References

External links
 Epstein's Blog at The Huffington Post
 Right Livelihood Award

1926 births
2018 deaths
American public health doctors
20th-century British medical doctors
University of Illinois Chicago faculty
American oncologists